Želetice is a municipality and village in Hodonín District in the South Moravian Region of the Czech Republic. It has about 500 inhabitants.

History

Notable people
František Komňacký (born 1951), football player and manager

References

Villages in Hodonín District
Moravian Slovakia